Pope Calixtus can refer to three different popes:

Pope Callixtus I, pope from about 217 to about 222
Pope Callixtus II, pope from 1119 to 1124
Pope Callixtus III, pope from 1455 to 1458